Alexander Fu Sheng (born Cheung Fu-sheng; 20 October 1954 – 7 July 1983), also known as Fu Sheng was a Hong Kong martial arts film star in the 1970s.

Life and career 
Born Cheung Fu-sheng in British Hong Kong in 20 October 1954. He was the ninth child of a wealthy New Territories indigenous inhabitant businessman Cheung Yan-lung. His birth mother was Angela Liu Fung-wo. 

In 1971, he enrolled at Shaw Brothers Southern Drama School and instantly drew the attention of director Chang Cheh. Cheh had Fu Sheng train with Lau Kar-leung for 6 months. Fu Sheng made his film debut as an extra in the 1972 film The Fourteen Amazons. His first lead role was in Cheh's Police Force.  Some of his other films include Heroes Two, Five Shaolin Masters, Shaolin Temple and the Brave Archer series. He eventually made a total of 23 films with Cheh.

In 1976, he married singer and actress Jenny Tseng, who had appeared with him in the film New Shaolin Boxers.
He suffered a series of injuries in 1978 and 1979. On the set of The Deadly Breaking Sword a wire suspending him snapped and he fell eight feet landing on his head. While working on Heroes Shed No Tears, he shattered bones in his right leg.

Fu Sheng was rumored to star in Snake in the Eagle's Shadow but Jackie Chan was eventually cast in the role.

On 7 July 1983, tragedy struck when Fu Sheng, his younger brother and fellow Shaw actor David Cheung Chin-pang and another Shaw actor Wong Yue involved in an automobile accident. Both Cheung and Wong survived but Fu Sheng, aged 28, later died of his injuries at the hospital.  At the time, the three were filming The Eight Diagram Pole Fighter in which Fu Sheng was to be the hero. The film was partially re-written and the remainder of the film was shot. In the finished film, Fu Sheng's character abruptly disappears and the focus was put on co-star Gordon Liu's character.
His funeral was organised by the Shaw Brothers committee. His remains were cremated and were interred at Fung Ying Seen Koon at Fanling town, part of Fanling–Sheung Shui New Town in Hong Kong.

He made his final film appearance the film Wits of the Brats which was also the only film he directed and was released almost a year after his death.

In 2012, his wife Jenny Tseng finally admitted to the media that before his tragic death, they had four miscarriages during their marriage together and Fu Sheng had decided to go to a sperm bank to expel and preserve his semen at the sperm bank clinic. Eventually sometime after his death, Tseng had gone to the sperm bank clinic to use her late husband's semen to become artificially inseminated, leading to her giving birth to their daughter Melody.

Filmography 
The Fourteen Amazons (1972) - soldier (extra)
Young People (1972) - drum player (extra)
Four Riders a.k.a. Hellfighters of the East and Strike 4 Revenge (1972) - soldier at Jukebox (extra)
Man of Iron a.k.a. Warrior of Steel (1972) - young man with a bicycle (extra)
The Thunderbolt Fist (1972) - (extra)
Generation Gap (1973) - Ah Qiang
Police Force (1973) - Liang Kuan
Heroes Two a.k.a. Kung Fu Invaders (1974) - Fang Shih Yu
Three Styles of Hung School's Kung Fu – A Demonstration Film of the Chinese Kung Fu (1974) - himself
Na Cha The Great (1974) - Na Cha
Men from the Monastery a.k.a. Disciples of Death and Dragon's Teeth (1974) - Fang Shih Yu
Friends (1974) - Du Jiaji
Shaolin Martial Arts a.k.a. Five Fingers of Death (1974) - Li Yao
5 Shaolin Masters a.k.a. The 5 Masters of Death (1974) - Ma Chao-Hsing
Disciples of Shaolin a.k.a. The Invincible One (1975) - Guan Fengyi
Marco Polo a.k.a. The Four Assassins (1975) - Li Xiongfeng
Boxer Rebellion a.k.a. The Bloody Avengers (1976) - Tsang Hin Hon
7-Man Army (1976) - Private He Hong Fa
The Shaolin Avengers a.k.a. Invincible Kung Fu Brothers (1976) - Fang Shih Yu
New Shaolin Boxers a.k.a. Demon Fists of Kung Fu (1976) - Zhong Jian
Shaolin Temple a.k.a. Death Chamber (1976) - Fang Shih Yu
The Naval Commandos (1977) - Xiao Liu
Magnificent Wanderers a.k.a. Magnificent Kung Fu Warriors (1977) - Lin Shao You
The Brave Archer a.k.a. Kung Fu Warlords (1977) - Kuo Tsing
The Chinatown Kid (1977) - Tang Tong
The Brave Archer 2 a.k.a. Kung Fu Warlords Part II (1978) - Kuo Tsing
Avenging Eagle (1978) - Double Sword Sleeve Cheuk Yi Fan
Life Gamble (1979) - Yun Xiang
The Proud Twins (1979) - Jiang Xiaoyu (Xiaoyu'er)
The Deadly Breaking Sword (1979) - Xiao Dao
Heroes Shed No Tears (1980) - Kao Chien Fei
Heaven and Hell a.k.a. Shaolin Hellgate (1980) - Chen Ding
Ten Tigers from Kwangtung (1980) - Tam Ming
Return of the Sentimental Swordsman (1981) - Jing Wuming
The Brave Archer 3 a.k.a. Blast of the Iron Palm (1982) - Kuo Tsing
Legendary Weapons of China a.k.a. Legendary Weapons of Kung Fu (1982) - Mo
The Brave Archer and His Mate a.k.a. Mysterious Island (1982) - Yang Kuo
The Fake Ghost Catchers (1982) - Wu Shunchao
Cat vs Rat (1982), the Rat Bai Yu Tong
My Rebellious Son a.k.a. Raging Tiger (1982) - Chang Siu Tai
Treasure Hunters a.k.a. Master of Disaster (1982) - Chi Ta Po
Hong Kong Playboys (1983) - Yan Quan Sheng
Eight-Diagram Pole Fighter a.k.a. The Invincible Pole Fighters (1983) - 6th Yang (final film role)
Wits of the Brats (1984) - Che Zai (released posthumously; also director)

References

External links 
 
 Alexander Fu Sheng at Hong Kong Cinemagic
 Alexander Fu Sheng: Biography of the Chinatown Kid

1954 births
1983 deaths
Shaw Brothers Studio
Hong Kong male film actors
Hong Kong male karateka
Hong Kong male television actors
Fu Sheng
Road incident deaths in Hong Kong
20th-century Hong Kong male actors